Inanidrilus vacivus is a species of annelid worm. It is known from subtidal zone of the Atlantic coast of Florida in the Hutchinson Island. Preserved specimens measure  in length.

References

vacivus
Invertebrates of the United States
Taxa named by Christer Erséus
Fauna of the Atlantic Ocean
Animals described in 1984